Union Avenue may refer to:
 Union Avenue Stakes
 Union Avenue, Montreal
 Union Avenue Historic District in Saratoga Springs, New York
Union Avenue Historic Commercial District, Colorado
Union Avenue Bridge (Passaic River)
Union Avenue Line (Brooklyn)
Union Avenue (Bakersfield)

See also
 Union Turnpike (disambiguation)